Bouwfonds is an international real estate company and one of the largest in the Netherlands. The company was established in 1946, just after the Second World War, as local government property developer with the aim to help working-class people buy their own home. In 2000 it was sold to ABN Amro. According to a recent report from the Dutch daily De Volkskrant the circumstances under which the privatization took place constitute an economic scandal. As the report claims " (...) Bouwfonds staff leaked documents to ABN Amro CEO Rijkman Groenink. These included confidential details about a bid by ING, allowing ABN Amro to trump the offer.". Since December 2006, Bouwfonds has been part of Rabo Real Estate Group.

See also
Bouwfonds and Philips pension fund real estate fraud, codenamed as Klimop case by the Dutch ministry of justice and the FIOD.

References

External links
 Official site
 "Dirty tricks during Bouwfonds privatisation," DutchNews.nl (31 March 2010)
 “Property fraud costs Philips, Rabobank €250m,” DutchNews.nl (4 November 2009).
 “Amsterdam in Zuidas corruption probe,” DutchNews.nl (1 April 2008).
 “ABN Amro integration on track: Fortis,” DutchNews.nl (28 February 2008).
 “More arrests expected in property fraud case,” DutchNews.nl (21 February 2008).

Financial services companies established in 1946
Real estate companies established in 1946
Investment management companies of the Netherlands
Real estate companies of the Netherlands
Financial scandals